The International Society of Indoor Air Quality and Climate (ISIAQ) is a non-profit scientific organization seeking to advance and support the creation of healthy and comfortable indoor building environments. In 1992, the institution of ISIAQ was decided by a group of 109 international scientists and other multidisciplinary practitioners following the 5th International Conference on Indoor Air Quality and Climate (also known as Indoor Air '90) in Toronto, 1990.

Academy of Fellows 
In 1991, the International Academy of Indoor Air Sciences (IAIAS) was founded to promote the practice of research and outstanding service of the indoor air sciences. The IAIAS merged with ISIAQ and changed into the Academy of Fellows in 2005.

Its members are composed of multidisciplinary and interdisciplinary scientists involved in all aspects of indoor air quality, government and regulatory, environmental and occupational health professionals, medical practitioners, engineers in the fields of construction and air-conditioning, architects and  building owners and managers.

References 

Organizations established in 1992
Non-profit organizations based in Herndon, Virginia
Scientific organizations established in 1992
Learned societies of the United States